The 2009 LKL All-Star Game was played on February 21, 2009, at Šiaulių arena, in Šiauliai, home of BC Šiauliai. The game was the 15th annual LKL All-Star Game. It was the second time that Šiauliai had hosted the basketball showcase, after previously hosting it in 2008.

The All-Star Game

Rosters

Coaches
The coach for the Vilkai was Lietuvos Rytas head coach Rimas Kurtinaitis. The coach for the Ereliai was Žalgiris head coach Gintaras Krapikas.

All-Star Weekend

Three-Point Shootout

Slam Dunk Contest

External links
LKL.com

Lietuvos krepšinio lyga All-Star Game
2008–09 LKL season